is a passenger train station of Hokkaido Railway Company in Kushiro, Hokkaido, Japan.
 of Japan Freight Railway Company is adjacently located and had also been called Shin-Fuji until the renaming on March 12, 2011.

Lines
Hokkaido Railway Company, Japan Freight Railway Company
Nemuro Main Line Station K52

History
The station opened on December 25, 1923, for both passenger and freight trains. The freight terminal was renamed Kushiro Freight Terminal on March 12, 2011.

Adjacent stations

References

Railway stations in Hokkaido Prefecture
Railway stations in Japan opened in 1923